The 2013–14 Eintracht Frankfurt season was the club's 114th season in its history. In 2013–14, the club played in the Bundesliga, the top tier of German football, the club's second season back in this league and its 45th overall.  The club also participated in the UEFA Europa League, where it began in the play-off round and reached the round of 32.

Matches

Legend

Friendlies

Bundesliga

League table

Results summary

Results by round

Matches

DFB-Pokal

UEFA Europa League

Indoor soccer tournament (Frankfurt Cup)

Squad

Squad and statistics

|}

Transfers

Transferred in

Transferred out

References

External links
 Official English Eintracht website 
 German archive site
 2013–14 Eintracht Frankfurt season at kicker.de 
 2013–14 Eintracht Frankfurt season at Fussballdaten.de 

2013-14
German football clubs 2013–14 season
2013–14 UEFA Europa League participants seasons